The Australian Labor Party National Conference (sometimes referred to as the Federal Conference) is an internal body of the Australian Labor Party, one of the major political parties in Australia. It is the highest representative body of the party's state and territory branches. The National Conference takes place triennially, the most recent being the 48th conference held in Adelaide in 2018, and which was attended by 397 party delegates. Other recent Conferences were the 2011 National Conference held on 3 December 2011, and the 2015 National Conference held in Melbourne. The next National Conference will take place in March 2021.

The National Conference drafts a statement of party policy, called the National Platform, In practice, however, Labor policy is determined by the leader of the Parliamentary Labor Party.

Decisions of the Conference are implemented by the National Executive. Twenty members of the National Executive are elected by the National Conference.
The National Conference does not elect the party's parliamentary leaders, which since 2013 has been by a ballot of both the Parliamentary Caucus and by the Labor Party's rank-and-file members. The national president and vice-presidents are elected by a vote of party members. On many matters votes at the Conference take place on a factional basis. In the past, the Labor Right faction held a majority at the National Conference, though it lost the majority at the 2015 National Conference.

Notable actions and positions

Socialist objective
The 1922 National Conference adopted a "socialist objective," which remained official policy for many years. The resolution was qualified, however, by the "Blackburn amendment," which said that "socialisation" was desirable only when necessary to "eliminate exploitation and other anti-social features." In practice the socialist objective was a dead letter. Only once has a federal Labor government attempted to nationalise any industry (Ben Chifley's bank nationalisation of 1947), and that was held by the High Court to be unconstitutional. The commitment to nationalisation was dropped after urging by Gough Whitlam in the 1970s, and in the 1980s Bob Hawke's government carried out many free market reforms including the floating of the dollar and privatisation of state enterprises such as Qantas airways and the Commonwealth Bank.

Expulsion of the New South Wales branch

In March 1931, a Special Federal Conference was called in response to the actions of the New South Wales state executive, which was controlled by the Lang Labor faction. The New South Wales state leader, Jack Lang, had been openly defying the federal Labor government for several months. The most immediate trigger was the state party's actions at the East Sydney by-election, where it announced that its candidate, Eddie Ward, would be bound only by the decisions of the state executive, not the federal caucus. At the conference, which the New South Wales Branch boycotted, John Curtin successfully moved for the branch's expulsion; the motion was carried by 25 votes to four. The conference also gave the Federal Executive the power to suspend or dissolve any other state branch "acting or having acted in a manner deemed [...] contrary to the Federal Constitution, Platform, and Policy of the Party". The conference subsequently moved for the establishment of a new ALP branch in New South Wales loyal to the Federal Executive, which became known as the "Federal Labor Party". As the Federal Executive had no power to dissolve the original branch (controlled by Lang), the two parties competed against each other at elections for several years. The rebellious branch was eventually re-admitted to the party at another Special Federal Conference in Melbourne in 1936.

Uranium mining
The 1977 National Conference voted in favour of an indefinite moratorium on uranium mining. However, the 1982 National Conference changed the anti-uranium position in favour of a "one mine policy". After the ALP won power in 1983, the 1984 National Conference adopted a "three mine policy". This referred to the then three existing uranium mines in Australia, Nabarlek, Ranger and Roxby Downs/Olympic Dam, and articulated ALP support for pre-existing mines and contracts, but opposition to any new mining.

Same-sex Marriage
The 2011 National Conference voted in favour of recognition of same-sex marriage in Australia, and also formally endorsed a motion to allow Labor members of parliament the ability to vote in accordance with their consciences. Since the Opposition parties bound their members to oppose equal marriage, a bill to this effect was defeated, with Prime Minister Julia Gillard and others opposing it.  Equal marriage was ultimately introduced following by a conscience vote held under the Turnbull conservative government, following a postal survey

References

National Conference
Political party assemblies